was a Japanese painter in the Nihonga style and board chairman of the Nitten, a significant Japanese art conference. He and his older brother, Eizō Katō, have a museum dedicated to their works in Gifu, Gifu Prefecture.

Biography
1916 Born in Gifu's Mitono-machi as the fifth son of a lacquerware merchant
1934 Graduated from Gifu Junior High School
1941 Entered into the Tokyo Fine Arts School in Nihonga Studies
1947 Graduates from the Tokyo Fine Arts School in Nihonga Studies; enters his first work (白暮) to the Japan Art Academy's third annual exhibition and has it selected

1991 The Eizō & Tōichi Katō Memorial Art Museum was opened in Gifu
1993 Completes the wall partition for the great alcove at Kinkaku-ji
1995 Obtains recognition from Japan as an "outstanding contributor to culture"
1996 Receives honorary citizenship in Gifu
1996 Dies of pneumonia at the age of 80
1997 Receives honorary citizenship in Fujisawa, Kanagawa Prefecture

1916 births
1996 deaths
Nihonga painters
People from Gifu
Buddhist artists
Tokyo School of Fine Arts alumni
20th-century Japanese painters